Jessica Rae Springsteen (born December 30, 1991) is an American equestrian. The daughter of musicians Bruce Springsteen and Patti Scialfa, she is a show jumping champion rider who has represented the United States Equestrian Team in international competition and won a silver medal in the Team jumping at the 2020 Summer Olympics held in 2021 in Tokyo.

Early life
Jessica Rae Springsteen was born on December 30, 1991, the second child and only daughter of musicians Bruce Springsteen and Patti Scialfa. She has one older brother, Evan James Springsteen (born 1990), and one younger brother, Samuel Ryan Springsteen (born 1994). When she and her brothers reached school-going age in the early 1990s, their parents left Los Angeles with them specifically to raise a family in a non-paparazzi environment. The family owned and lived on a horse farm in Colts Neck Township, New Jersey. They also owned homes in Los Angeles, as well as in Wellington, Florida, and Rumson, New Jersey.

Springsteen attended the Rumson Country Day School and Ranney School in New Jersey. She earned an undergraduate degree from Duke University on May 11, 2014. After embarking on a career as a show jumping rider, she also did some modeling and was named the equestrian ambassador for Gucci.

Career
Springsteen has been riding since she was four years old, with horses kept on the Springsteen family's 300-acre Stone Hill Farm in Colts Neck, New Jersey. She got her first pony when she was six years old. As a youth equitation rider, she first won classes in the pony division, including the Washington International Pony Equitation Classic Final, and as a teen won the 2008 ASPCA Maclay National Championship in a ride-off where her particularly bold riding stood out. She also won the 2009 George H. Morris Excellence in Equitation Championship.

As an adult competitor, in 2011 she competed in the Royal Windsor Horse Show competing on her horse Vordnado Van Den Hoendrik. In September 2012, Peter Charles, who had represented Great Britain at the 2012 Summer Olympics in the Equestrian events, sold his team gold medal-winning horse, Vindicat W, to Springsteen. Springsteen herself was an alternate rider for the United States at the 2012 Summer Olympics. In 2014, she won the American Gold Cup. In 2016, she won her first five-star Grand Prix jumping competition with her horse Cynar VA, but did not make the short list for the U.S. Equestrian team for the 2016 Summer Olympics. In May 2017, she won the Falcon Stakes CSI 5* at the Royal Windsor Horse Show riding Davendy S.

She formerly trained with Frank and Stacia Klein Madden and then trained with Laura Kraut from 2010 to 2015. Since May 2015 she trains with Edwina Tops-Alexander.

In 2021, Springsteen was selected in the US team to compete in equestrian at the 2020 Summer Olympics, which had been postponed due to the COVID-19 pandemic. She finished equal 31st in the qualifying round of the individual jumping, but only the top 30 advanced to the medals round. On August 7, 2021 she was part of the U.S. team that won the silver medal in the Team jumping.

Gallery

References

External links

 Jessica Springsteen on Instagram

1991 births
American show jumping riders
Duke University alumni
People from Colts Neck Township, New Jersey
Place of birth missing (living people)
Ranney School alumni
Sportspeople from Monmouth County, New Jersey
Jessica
Living people
American female equestrians
Sportspeople from Los Angeles
Equestrians at the 2020 Summer Olympics
Medalists at the 2020 Summer Olympics
Olympic silver medalists for the United States in equestrian
American people of Italian descent
American people of Dutch descent
American people of Irish descent